Parliamentary procedure is the body of rules, ethics, and customs governing meetings and other operations of clubs, organizations, legislative bodies, and other deliberative assemblies. General principles of parliamentary procedure include rule of the majority with respect for the minority.

Purpose
The purpose of parliamentary procedure is for the assembly to conduct its businesses in the most efficient way possible while considering the rights of its members.

Principles

Majority rule 
The basic principle of decision is majority vote.

Minority rights 
The minority have certain rights that only a supermajority, such as a two-thirds vote, can rule over. Such rights include introducing new business and speaking in debate.

Member rights 
Members have the right to attend meetings, speak in debate, make (and second) motions, and vote. 
A member cannot be individually deprived of these rights except through disciplinary procedures. 

Members have the right to know what they are deciding on. The assembly acts on fairness and good faith. All members are treated equally. Members are expected to be of honorable character.

One question at a time 
Only one Main motion can be pending at a time. According to Robert's Rules of Order Newly Revised (RONR), this rule is considered to be a "fundamental principle of parliamentary law".

One person, one vote 
Each member has a vote and each vote is weighted equally. According to RONR, this rule is considered to be a "fundamental principle of parliamentary law". Exceptions to this rule, such as cumulative voting, must be expressly provided for in the organization's rules.

Only members present can vote 
The decisions made by members present at a meeting are the official acts in the name of the organization. According to RONR, this rule is considered to be a "fundamental principle of parliamentary law". Exceptions for absentee voting would have to be expressly provided for in the organization's rules. Nonmembers are not allowed to vote.

Changing action previously decided on 
Under RONR, the requirements for changing a previous action are greater than those for taking the action in the first place. A motion to rescind, repeal or annul or amend something already (previously) adopted, for instance, requires a two-thirds vote, a majority with previous notice, or a majority of the entire membership.

However, under The Standard Code of Parliamentary Procedure, a repeal or amendment of something already adopted requires only the same vote (usually a majority) and notice that was needed to adopt it in the first place.

Following own specific rules 
The group must have the authority to take the actions it purports to take. To be valid, any action or decision of a body must not violate any applicable law or constitutional provision. Also, actions cannot be in conflict with a decision previously made unless that action is rescinded or amended. The body can change the rules it wants to follow as long as it follows the rules for making such changes.

Absentee members rights 
Certain actions require previous notice, which protects the rights of absentees. This includes notice of the meetings. There also needs to be a quorum, or the minimum number of members to be present at a meeting.

Nonmembers rights 

Under RONR nonmembers have none of these rights and the assembly can exclude any or all of them from the proceedings.

References 

Parliamentary procedure